Gubadag District was until 9 November 2022 a district of Daşoguz Province in Turkmenistan. It was abolished by parliamentary decree on 9 November 2022.

References

Districts of Turkmenistan
Daşoguz Region